William Oliver Baker (July 15, 1915 – October 31, 2005) was president of Bell Labs from 1973 to 1979 and advisor on scientific matters to five United States presidents.

Biography
He was born on July 15, 1915 in Chestertown, Maryland.

He received his degree from Washington College and went on to get a doctorate from Princeton University, studying under Charles Phelps Smyth. He later did research for Bell Labs that helped lead to synthetic rubber. He held 11 patents in all. He headed Bell Labs from 1973 to 1979. Prior to being named president, he had served as Bell Labs Vice President for Research since 1955. Baker had lived in the New Vernon section of Harding Township and was a longtime resident of Morristown, New Jersey.

In 1979, he was a resident of Morristown, NJ upon his tenure ending as President of Bell Labs. 

He died of heart failure on October 31, 2005 in Chatham, New Jersey.

Awards and Honors 
Member of the United States National Academy of Sciences (1961)
Perkin Medal (1963)
Member of the American Philosophical Society (1963)
Fellow of the American Academy of Arts and Sciences (1965)
Priestley Medal (1966)
IRI Medal from the Industrial Research Institute (1970)
American Institute of Chemists Gold Medal (1975)
 Charles Lathrop Parsons Award, American Chemical Society (1976)
Miles Conrad Award, NFAIS (1977)
Willard Gibbs Award (1978)
Vannevar Bush Award (1981)
SASA Medal of Achievement (1984) Thereafter known as the William Oliver Baker Award
National Medal of Science (1988)
Benjamin Franklin Medal for Distinguished Achievement in the Sciences of the American Philosophical Society (2000).
AAAS Philip Hauge Abelson Prize (1995)
Marconi Society (2003)

References

External links 
Oral History interview transcript for William O. Baker on 7 May 1996, American Institute of Physics, Niels Bohr Library and Archives
William O. Baker Papers at the Seeley G. Mudd Manuscript Library, Princeton University
William O. Baker tribute site 

1915 births
2005 deaths
People from Harding Township, New Jersey
People from Morristown, New Jersey
Washington College alumni
Princeton University alumni
20th-century American chemists
Fellows of the American Academy of Arts and Sciences
National Medal of Science laureates
Scientists at Bell Labs
Fellows of the American Physical Society
Members of the United States National Academy of Sciences
Members of the National Academy of Medicine
Members of the American Philosophical Society